Several ships of the Japan Maritime Self-Defense Force have been named Shimokita:

 JDS Shimokita (LST-4002) (1961), ex-US LST-835 acquired by Japan in 1961. Later sold to the Philippine Navy
 , a tank landing ship commissioned in 2002

 

Japan Maritime Self-Defense Force ship names
Japanese Navy ship names